Bucculatrix epibathra is a moth in the family Bucculatricidae. It is found in India. It was first described in 1934 by Edward Meyrick.

References

Natural History Museum Lepidoptera generic names catalog

Bucculatricidae
Moths described in 1934
Taxa named by Edward Meyrick
Moths of Asia